Levinson's theorem is an important theorem in non-relativistic quantum scattering theory. It relates the number of bound states of a potential to the difference in phase of a scattered wave at zero and infinite energies. It was published by Norman Levinson in 1949.

Statement of theorem
The difference in the -wave phase shift of a scattered wave at zero energy, and infinite energy, for a spherically symmetric potential  is related to the number of bound states  by:

 

The case  is exceptional and it can only happen in -wave scattering. The following conditions are sufficient to guarantee the theorem:
 continuous in  except for a finite number of finite discontinuities

References

External links
M. Wellner, "Levinson's Theorem (an Elementary Derivation," Atomic Energy Research Establishment, Harwell, England. March 1964.

Theorems in quantum mechanics

de:Compton-Effekt#Compton-Wellenlänge